Hook railway station serves the village of Hook and surrounding villages in Hampshire, southern England. There are two platforms serving the outer pair of tracks while the centre pair of tracks have no platforms and are used by through-services.

Trains typically run every 30 minutes in each direction between Waterloo and Basingstoke. It is located within a five-minute walk of Hook.

History
The railway that runs through Hook was built in 1839, but Hook only got its railway station in 1883 after a lengthy campaign by local landowners. It was built by London and South Western Railway in their typical style. It was built with two platforms and two tracks, but was expanded to four platforms and tracks in 1901-2 as Hook grew in size. The middle island platform was removed around the 1960s but its tracks still survive.

In 1940, a bomb landed on the tracks a little way from the station. Worried it could damage the tracks, six soldiers were called to dispose of the bomb. Unfortunately, the bomb went off killing the six soldiers and injuring their sergeant. A group of local people have arranged to have a memorial plaque to them displayed in the station.

Notes

References

Railway stations in Hampshire
DfT Category D stations
Railway stations in Great Britain opened in 1883
Former London and South Western Railway stations
Railway stations served by South Western Railway